Walter Werzowa (born 15 December 1960) is an Austrian composer, producer and owner of LA-based music production studio Musikvergnuegen. He is most famous for composing the "Intel bong" jingle and the 1980s hit "Bring Me Edelweiss" as part of the band Edelweiss. Walter Werzowa joined an AI team to co-write Beethoven’s 10th symphony, that premiered October 9, 2021 in Bonn. He is leading the music department for the immersive Mozart! Experience Vienna.

Biography

Walter Werzowa was born in Vienna, Austria, where he studied classical guitar and electronic music at Vienna Musik Hochschule. His collaboration with Otto M. Zykan opened doors for contemporary classical music. Walter moved to the United States of America after Edelweiss disbanded, at which point, he studied film music at the University of Southern California. Werzowa has been featured in various literature and referred to as "the guru of audio branding."  He and his wife Evelyne currently reside in Los Angeles with their three children Camille, Julien, and Lucca.

In 2016, Werzowa received his Master of Arts degree from the University of Santa Monica.

Career

Werzowa is well known for having composed and produced the Intel "Bong," which is allegedly broadcast somewhere in the world once every five minutes. Since its conception in 1994, he has re-arranged it to keep it current, most recently in 2015, when he composed the mashup of the Intel "Bong" mnemonic and Beethoven's 5th Symphony to create "Symphony in Blue", the anthem for Intel's Experience Amazing campaign which premiered during Super Bowl 50.

Besides audio branding, Werzowa also composes music for feature films. Most recently, he scored the documentary, Author: The JT LeRoy Story, which was written and directed by Jeff Feuerzeig and is the only film on this subject thus far to receive American and European theatrical distribution, it premiered in United States theaters in September 2016. Previously, Werzowa has scored the main themes to Eraser (starring Arnold Schwarzenegger),Taking Lives (starring Angelina Jolie), The Hunted, Yippee and The Devil and Daniel Johnston, which received a Sundance Film Festival award. He also earned a music credit on Steven Spielberg's Minority Report and in 2008 he worked on 8: Person to Person, which was directed by Wim Wenders.

Werzowa also composed the Nova theme.

In 2014, Music Beyond, the production music library founded by Werzowa in 2005, was acquired by BMG. Werzowa now serves in a consultant capacity at both BMG and Beyond.

In 2016, Werzowa launched HealthTunes.org, a free music/sound streaming platform that offers academically and scientifically researched Health Music and evidence-based clinical reference.

In 2021, Walter premiers Ludwig van Beethoven's 10 Symphony in Bonn. DTAG. CD released on Modern Records BMG

References

External links
 Official IMDB Page 

1960 births
21st-century classical composers
Austrian classical musicians
Austrian classical composers
Living people
Musicians from Vienna
USC Thornton School of Music alumni
Austrian male classical composers
21st-century male musicians